The 2022 Louisiana Tech Bulldogs football team represented Louisiana Tech University as a member of Conference USA (C-USA) during the 2022 NCAA Division I FBS football season. They were led by first year head coach Sonny Cumbie. The Bulldogs played their home games at Joe Aillet Stadium in Ruston, Louisiana.

Previous season
The 2021 team finished with an overall record of 3–9. The team went 2–6 in Conference USA play, finishing in last place of the West Division. Head coach Skip Holtz was fired after the season concluded. Holtz finished his tenure at Louisiana Tech with an overall record of 64–50 through nine seasons.

Offseason

Coaching changes
On November 30, Texas Tech offensive coordinator and quarterbacks coach Sonny Cumbie was hired as the Bulldogs' new head coach. At the time of his hiring by Louisiana Tech, Cumbie was also serving as Texas Tech's interim head coach. Cumbie initially split time between the two programs, coaching the Red Raiders in the Liberty Bowl.

Preseason

C-USA media day
The Conference USA media day was held on July 27 at Globe Life Field in Arlington, Texas. The Bulldogs were represented by head coach Sonny Cumbie, offensive lineman Joshua Mote, and defensive lineman Keive Rose. The Bulldogs were predicted to finish ninth in the conference's preseason poll.

Schedule
Louisiana Tech and Conference USA announced the 2022 football schedule on March 30, 2022.

Game summaries

at Missouri

No. 18 (FCS) Stephen F. Austin

at No. 5 Clemson

at South Alabama

UTEP

at North Texas

Rice

at FIU

Middle Tennessee

at UTSA

at Charlotte

UAB

References

Louisiana Tech
Louisiana Tech Bulldogs football seasons
Louisiana Tech Bulldogs football